Isaac Wilbour (April 25, 1763October 4, 1837) was an American politician from Rhode Island holding several offices, including the sixth Governor of the state.

Biography
Wilbour was born in Little Compton in the Colony of Rhode Island and Providence Plantations.  He served in the state legislature in 1805 and 1806.  From October 1805 to May 1806 he served as speaker.  He was Lieutenant Governor from 1806 to 1807. There had been no winner in the gubernatorial election in 1806, so he was Acting Governor from May 7, 1806, to May 6, 1807.

Wilbour represented Rhode Island in the United States House of Representatives as a Democratic-Republican from 1807 to 1809.  He ran again in 1808 and 1812 but lost both times.  He served as Lieutenant Governor again from 1810 to 1811.

In May 1818 he became an associate justice of the Supreme Court of Rhode Island and acted as Chief Justice of that court from May 1819 to May 1827.

Wilbour died in Little Compton, Rhode Island, and his remains were buried in the Seaconnet Cemetery.

References

Biographical Directory of the United States Congress
National Governor's Association

1763 births
1837 deaths
Governors of Rhode Island
Lieutenant Governors of Rhode Island
American Quakers
Chief Justices of the Rhode Island Supreme Court
Country Party (Rhode Island) state governors of the United States
Democratic-Republican Party members of the United States House of Representatives from Rhode Island
Speakers of the Rhode Island House of Representatives
Democratic-Republican Party state governors of the United States